Peter Edward Ramsbotham, 3rd Viscount Soulbury  (8 October 1919 – 9 April 2010) was a British diplomat and colonial administrator.

Early life 
Born in London, Ramsbotham was the younger son of Herwald Ramsbotham, later the 1st Viscount Soulbury. He was educated at Eton College and at Magdalen College, Oxford. At Oxford he contracted polio in 1938, which left him with a slightly shorter right leg.

World War II 
He was already working for MI5 as a civilian when he joined the army on the outbreak of the Second World War. In April 1941, Ramsbotham was working in B3 Division of MI5 (Communications) with the task of studying the activities of foreign journalists in the UK. In July he was with B3A (Censorship) before moving to E3 (Alien Control – USA citizens in the UK and other territories). By 1943 he was with E2 Division dealing with nationals from the Baltic states, the Balkans and Central Europe. In June 1943, he left MI5 and was later commissioned into the Intelligence Corps on 9 June 1944. As a fluent speaker in French, he continued to work with MI5 on the Continent as a member of 106 Special Counter Intelligence Unit (SCIU), running double agents and acting as a liaison officer to the counter-espionage section of the French Intelligence Service. He also reported to the '212' Committee', the Allied equivalent of MI5's 'XX Committee' ('Double Cross Committee'). At the close of hostilities, he was employed in the Political Division of the Control Commissions for both Germany and Austria and served also in Hamburg and Berlin. In recognition of his exemplary service during the war, he received a Mention in Despatches in August 1945 and was awarded a Croix de Guerre on 1 March 1949 (en bloc).

Diplomatic Service 
In 1948, Ramsbotham joined the diplomatic service on the advice of his superior, Sir Christopher Steel. He failed the Foreign Office exam on his first attempt, due to poor mathematical skill, but passed six months later after some coaching. His first position was in the German Department of the Foreign Office in London.

His posts included High Commissioner to Cyprus (1969–1971) Ambassador to Iran (1971–1974) and Ambassador to the United States (1974–1977). He had a close relationship with Jimmy Carter, and was the first ambassador Carter invited to the White House.

Ramsbotham was removed from his position as Ambassador to the United States by incoming Foreign Secretary David Owen. Owen controversially replaced him with Peter Jay, who was economics editor of The Times, the son-in-law of Prime Minister James Callaghan and Owen's personal friend.

Governor 
Ramsbotham's final posting was as Governor of Bermuda (1977–1980). During his governorship, the two assassins of Sir Richard Sharples, the former governor, were hanged. The executions were followed by extensive rioting, as a result of which troops had to be sent to Bermuda to restore order.

Honours and title 
He was appointed Companion (CMG) of the Order of St Michael and St George in 1964, promoted to Knight Commander (KCMG) in 1972, becoming Sir Peter Ramsbotham, and promoted again to Knight Grand Cross (GCMG) in 1978. In 1976, he was appointed Knight Grand Cross (GCVO) of the Royal Victorian Order as well as Knight (KStJ) of the Venerable Order of St John of Jerusalem. He inherited the title of Viscount Soulbury from his elder brother in 2004 but continued to be known as Sir Peter Ramsbotham.

Family 
His first marriage was to Frances Marie Massie Blomfield. They were married on 30 August 1941 and their marriage ended with her death in 1982. His second marriage was to Dr Zaida Mary Hall, née Megrah, in 1985 (died 17 March 2013). He died in New Alresford, Hampshire on 9 April 2010.

References 
Who's Who 2009

External links 

Cracroft's Peerage
Interview with Hon Sir Peter Ramsbotham & transcript, British Diplomatic Oral History Programme, Churchill College, Cambridge, 2001

1919 births
2010 deaths
People educated at Eton College
Alumni of Magdalen College, Oxford
Ambassadors of the United Kingdom to Iran
Ambassadors of the United Kingdom to the United States
British Army personnel of World War II
Deputy Lieutenants of Hampshire
Governors of Bermuda
High Commissioners of the United Kingdom to Cyprus
Intelligence Corps officers
Knights Grand Cross of the Order of St Michael and St George
Knights Grand Cross of the Royal Victorian Order
Knights of the Order of St John
MI5 personnel
Recipients of the Croix de Guerre (France)
Viscounts in the Peerage of the United Kingdom
Younger sons of viscounts
Children of national leaders